Glee is an American musical comedy-drama television series that aired on Fox. It was created by Ryan Murphy, Brad Falchuk, and Ian Brennan. The pilot episode of the show was broadcast on May 19, 2009, and the rest of the season began on September 9, 2009. Fox initially ordered thirteen episodes of Glee, picking the show up for a full season on September 21, 2009, ordering nine more episodes. The remainder of the first season aired for nine consecutive weeks starting on April 13, 2010 and ending on June 8, 2010, when the season finale was broadcast.

The series focuses on a high school show choir, also known as a glee club, in the fictional William McKinley High School in Lima, Ohio. Will Schuester (Matthew Morrison) takes over the glee club after the former teacher (Stephen Tobolowsky) is fired for inappropriate contact with a male student. With a rag-tag group of misfit teenagers, Will attempts to restore the glee club to its former glory while tending to his developing feelings for his co-worker Emma (Jayma Mays), as well as defending the glee club's existence from the conniving cheerleading coach Sue Sylvester (Jane Lynch). A major focus of the series is the students in the glee club: their relationships as couples, their love of singing and desire for popularity coming into conflict due to their membership in the low-status club, and the many vicissitudes of life in high school and as a teenager.

The series' sixth and final season premiered on January 9, 2015, and ended on March 20 of the same year.

Series overview

Episodes

Season 1 (2009–10)

Season 2 (2010–11)

"The Sue Sylvester Shuffle" (episode 11), broadcast immediately after Super Bowl XLV on February 6, 2011, was watched by 26.8 million viewers in the U.S., as the highest-rated scripted TV broadcast in 3 years.

Season 3 (2011–12)

Season 4 (2012–13)

Season 5 (2013–14)

Season 6 (2015)

Ratings

See also 
 Glee albums discography
 Glee songs discography
 List of songs in Glee

Notes

References

External links
 

 0
Lists of American comedy-drama television series episodes
Lists of American teen comedy television series episodes
Lists of American teen drama television series episodes